Ämari is a small borough in Lääne-Harju Parish, Harju County, northern Estonia. As of 2011 Census, the settlement's population was 542, of which the Estonians were 190 (35.1%).

See also
Ämari Air Base

References

External links
Vasalemma Parish 

Boroughs and small boroughs in Estonia